Inside Moves is a 1980 American drama film directed by Richard Donner from a screenplay by Valerie Curtin and Barry Levinson, based on the novel of the same name by Todd Walton. The film stars John Savage, David Morse, Diana Scarwid, and Amy Wright. At the 53rd Academy Awards, Scarwid was nominated for Best Supporting Actress for her performance.

Plot 
After a suicide attempt leaves a man named Roary (John Savage) partially crippled, he finds himself living in a rundown house in Oakland, California. He spends a lot of time at a neighborhood bar, which is full of other disabled people, and becomes best friends with Jerry (David Morse), the barman with a bad leg.

Jerry gains the attention and respect from the Golden State Warriors when he scrimmages a player and loses narrowly. After the bar owner suffers a heart attack, a new waitress named Louise (Diana Scarwid) is hired. Roary develops romantic feelings for Louise.

Jerry's luck turns round when one of the professional basketball players lends him the money for an operation to fix his leg. Once he is fully healed, Jerry goes on to become a basketball star, fulfilling his lifelong dream. However, he abandons his old friends by pretending they never existed.

Later, Jerry's old friends begin to resent him for his negligence, Roary visits Jerry and pressures him to visit the bar. Jerry offers up a half-hearted excuse for his absence, and despite Roary's feelings, begins seeing Louise in secret.

Roary finally confronts Jerry about his behaviour, and offers some final thoughts on their friendship, and what the bar and its patrons meant during his recovery. After Roary leaves, Jerry angrily reflects on his past decisions.

Roary reunites with Louise. Jerry returns to the bar and reveals his insecurities to his old friends, who understand right away.

For the first time in twenty-five years Max closes the bar, so everyone can attend Jerry's basketball game.

Cast 

 John Savage as Roary
 David Morse as Jerry Maxwell
 Diana Scarwid as Louise
 Amy Wright as Anne
 Tony Burton as Lucius
 Bill Henderson as Blue Lewis
 Steve Kahan as Burt
 Jack O'Leary as Max
 Bert Remsen as Stinky
 Harold Russell as Wings
 Pepe Serna as Herrada
 Harold Sylvester as Alvin Martin
 Arnold Williams as Benny
 George Brenlin as Gil
 Gerri Dean as Hooker
 William Frankfather as Fryer

Production 
In his 2006 audio commentary for Superman II: The Richard Donner Cut, Donner states that he agreed to direct Inside Moves only to take his mind off of being fired and replaced from Superman II. He referred to Inside Moves as "the smallest film I could do that was just very near and dear to me, at that point, and I felt this is going to take my mind totally off that."

The film marked the return to the screen by disabled veteran Harold Russell, thirty-four years after his Oscar-winning role in The Best Years of Our Lives.

Donner's biographer James Christie relates how the director would often confuse cinematographer Kovács with his fellow Hungarian, Vilmos Zsigmond. When Zsigmond visited the set, Donner had T-shirts made up that read "MY NAME IS NOT LÁSZLÓ" and "MY NAME IS NOT VILMOS" for each of them. Later, they switched shirts and confused everyone.

Reception

Critical response
Metacritic, which uses a weighted average, assigned the film a score of 63 out of 100, based on 8 critics, indicating "generally favorable reviews". Janet Maslin of The New York Times wrote that "Inside Moves is such a well-acted movie, and parts of it are so effectively offbeat, that it rises above its own potential for sappiness, just as surely as its characters triumph over their troubles." Maslin also called it "a modest and sentimental movie, but also one that, on its own terms, accomplishes what it means to." Emanuel Levy described the film as "a compassionate, well acted melodrama about what it means to be a disabled American."

Accolades

References

External links 

 
 
 
 

1980 films
1980 drama films
American drama films
1980s English-language films
American basketball films
Golden State Warriors
Films about disability
Films set in Oakland, California
ITC Entertainment films
Films directed by Richard Donner
Films scored by John Barry (composer)
1980s American films
English-language drama films